Like a Dog may refer to:
 "Like a Dog" (song), a 2000 song by Powderfinger
 Like a Dog (album), a 2005 album by Izzy Stradlin